Carex inanis is a tussock-forming species of perennial sedge in the family Cyperaceae. It is native to parts of Asia.

See also
List of Carex species

References

inanis
Plants described in 1837
Taxa named by Carl Sigismund Kunth
Flora of China
Flora of Nepal
Flora of Tibet